Treasurer's House may refer to:

Treasurer's House, Martock, in Somerset, England
Treasurer's House, York, in North Yorkshire, England